Mario Cerrito is an American filmmaker, writer and producer in the horror/thriller genre. He has directed seven feature films through Cerrito Productions. His film Human Hibachi was released in 2020 and won Best Feature film at New Jersey Horror Con and was nominated for Best FX.

Early life
Mario was born in South Philadelphia and raised in Audubon, New Jersey. He is Italian American. He lived in Woodstown, New Jersey, and graduated from Woodstown High School in 2002. He played Division II baseball at Rowan College at Burlington County from 2003 to 2004.

Film production
Cerrito wrote, produced and directed his first feature film, Deadly Gamble, in 2015. it was made on a $10,000 budget and was signed to Gregory Hatanaka's distribution company Cinema Epoch. The film was released through national cable outlets in 2015.

Cerrito also wrote, produced and directed Human Hibachi (2019), a horror movie. Shot solely on an iPhone, the movie was initially deemed too extreme for a release to Amazon Prime and was released to its own website instead.  At the New Jersey Horror Con and Film Festival in 2021 it was nominated for Best FX and Best Feature film, winning the latter. The film was also an official selection of Philadelphia Independent Film Festival and signed to Troma Entertainment for release.

Cerrito directed The Listing with a $25,000 budget. It won best feature film at the 2019 HNN Film Festival. The film features horror actress Jessica Cameron. The movie was represented at Marché du Film, the business counterpart to the Cannes Film Festival.

Human Hibachi 2, made by Cerrito in the summer of 2021, stars Julie Chapin, Frank Volpe, Tammy Jean among others. The movie premiered in July 2022 in Philadelphia. It went on to win best feature film at New Jersey Horror Con and Film Festival in Atlantic City.  Troma Entertainment picked the movie up for worldwide release.  

Cerrito wrote and produced The House in the Pines featuring Mick Strawn as Director and Joe Nicolo from Butcher Bros. as composer.

Cerrito provided the main film location for the horror film A Place in Hell. The film won best home grown horror feature film at the 2016 Garden State Film Festival. The movie was released by Anchor Bay Entertainment to multiple Video On Demand platforms.

He has also produced Variety (2015), Arisen I SAW (2016), The Philly Offensive (2016), Chase Street (2016), and Right Before Your Eyes (2017), among others.

TV appearances
Cerrito and his family were featured on the Travel Channel's reality show Ghost Nation. Paranormal investigator Jason Hawes and his crew visited Cerrito's house and the program aired in October 2019. The episode was titled, "The Novelist's Nightmare."
He also had a minor role in the series Chase Street, which was featured on Amazon Prime.

Filmography

Personal life

Cerrito was invited to speak to the communication students about filmmaking at his alma mater Woodstown High School in 2014.

In 2016, Cerrito visited a sick seven-year-old boy with mitochondrial disease at Nemours Alfred I. DuPont Hospital for Children in Wilmington, Delaware. Cerrito gave the boy a signed poster of his movie and offered him a role in his upcoming film.

Cerrito teamed up with school resource officer Anthony Cicali of Riverside High School in 2018 to film a PSA video titled #DrinkDriveDie for their students. The video showed the dangers of drinking and driving in dramatic fashion to help kids make better decisions. The film debuted at the school's prom assembly.

In 2019 while at the Borgata Hotel and Casino in Atlantic City, Cerrito witnessed a 25-year-old professional volleyball player Eric Zaun plunge to his death from the 29th floor.

He and his wife Charmaine have been residents of Mantua Township, New Jersey since c. 2015.

References

Living people
Horror film directors
American film directors
Film directors from New Jersey
People from Audubon, New Jersey
People from Mantua Township, New Jersey
People from Woodstown, New Jersey
Woodstown High School alumni
Year of birth missing (living people)